Ban Thung Lo station is a railway station located in Khuan Chum Subdistrict, Ron Phibun District, Nakhon Si Thammarat.

Train services 
 Rapid train No. 173 / 174 Bangkok–Nakhon Si Thammarat–Bangkok
 Local train No. 451/452 Nakhon Si Thammarat–Sungai Kolok–Nakhon Si Thammarat
 Local train No. 455/456 Nakhon Si Thammarat–Yala–Nakhon Si Thammarat
 Local train No. 457/458 Nakhon Si Thammarat–Phatthalung–Nakhon Si Thammarat

References 
 
 
 
 

Railway stations in Thailand
Railway stations opened in 1914